Eve de Castro-Robinson (born 9 November 1956 in London, England) is a New Zealand composer, professor and graphic designer. Her compositions include orchestral, vocal, chamber and electroacoustic works. She studied at the University of Auckland, where in 1991 she became the first person to receive a DMus from the University. She is Associate Professor of Composition at the University of Auckland.

A "de Castro-Robinson Portrait" concert was held at the New Zealand International Festival of the Arts in Wellington in 2004 and a 50th birthday concert was held at the University of Auckland in 2006. Besides teaching and composing, she also reviews music, speaks and broadcasts on music. She has published a number of professional articles in Canzona and Music in New Zealand. De Castro-Robinson is a member of the SOUNZ board of trustees. She has been Secretary of the Composers Association of New Zealand, Convenor of the Nelson Composers’ Workshop, and currently directs the Karlheinz Company, the University of Auckland's resident contemporary music ensemble.

Honors and awards
Philip Neill Memorial Prize 1987
Auckland Philharmonia Composer in Residence 1991
Philip Neill Memorial Prize 1993
SOUNZ Contemporary Award 1998
CANZ Trust Fund Award 2000
Finalist - SOUNZ Contemporary Award 2006
SOUNZ Contemporary Award 2007
Best Classical Artist, Vodafone NZ Music Awards 2018, The Gristle of Knuckles (Rattle Records)

Works
Chaos of Delight (1998) for chamber ensemble
Other Echoes (2000) for orchestra
a pink-lit phase for flute, viola and harp	
Chaos of Delight III (2006) for women's voices
Five Responses for women's voices, male speaker, and mixed ensemble	
Len Songs for mezzo-soprano, clarinet, violin and piano	
Noah's Ark for large chamber ensemble	
Other echoes (2001), fanfare for orchestra
Releasing the Angel (2011), Atoll label, for cello and orchestra
Len Lye (2012) 90-minute five-act chamber opera, libretto by Roger Horrocks (Maidment Theatre, Auckland)
Split the Lark for violin and piano	
Triple Clarinet Concerto for E flat clarinet, B flat clarinet, bass clarinet and orchestra	
Tumbling Strains for violin and cello
Some of her scores have been published by Waiteata Press, Wellington.

Discography
 2018: The Gristle of Knuckles (Rattle Records RAT-D078)
 2016: I Stayed A Minute (Rattle Records RAT-D063)
 2013: Other echoes (Atoll Records ACD300)
 2011: Releasing the Angel (Atoll Records ACD141) Finalist in the 2012 NZ Music Awards, Best Classical Album
 1998: Chaos of Delight (Atoll Records A9806)

References

External links
 Interview with Eve de Castro Robinson for the Cultural Icons project. Audio and video.

1956 births
Living people
20th-century classical composers
New Zealand music teachers
Women classical composers
New Zealand classical composers
Women music educators
20th-century women composers